Nikollë or Kolë is an Albanian male given name, derived from the Greek name Νικόλαος (Nikolaos). The definite form is Nikolla.

Notable people bearing this name include:

Nikollë Bardhi (1551-1617), Albanian prelate of the Roman Catholic Church.
Nikollë Dukagjini, 15th-century member of the Dukagjini family.
Nikollë Leonik Tomeu (1456-1531), Albanian-born scholar and professor
Nikollë Keta (1741-1803), Arbëresh writer and priest.
Nikollë Bojaxhiu, Albanian businessman, benefactor and politician.
Nikollë Kaçorri (1862-1917), prominent figure of the National Renaissance of Albania.
Nikollë Ivanaj (1879-1951), Albanian publisher and writer from Malësia.
Nikollë Nikprelaj (born 1961), Albanian singer from Tuzi, Montenegro
Nikollë Lesi, Albanian politician.

See also
Nikollarë, a village near Berat in Albania, settlement named after "Niko" clan

References

Albanian masculine given names